Sichuan Football Club (Simplified Chinese: 四川足球俱乐部) was a professional Chinese football club under licence from the Chinese Football Association (CFA). The team is based in Chengdu, Sichuan, China.

History 
After Chinese Super League's team Sichuan First City disbanded, the sports department of Sichuan province decided to establish a new club. The new club, Sichuan F.C., was founded in February, 2006. After two seasons playing in China League Two, they finished up as runners-up and gained promotion to China League One. However, they relegated back after finishing at the bottom of the table in 2009 China League One.

They played their last season in 2012 China League Two, and has remained inactive since then.

Name history
2006– Sichuan F.C. 四川

Current squad

Coaching staff

Managerial history

  Zhai Biao (2006–2008)
  Sun Bowei (caretaker) (2008)
  Xu Jianye (2009–2010)
  Zhao Lei (2010)
  Sun Bowei (2011–2013)

Results
All-time League Rankings

As of the end of 2019 season.

in group stage

Key
<div>

 Pld = Played
 W = Games won
 D = Games drawn
 L = Games lost
 F = Goals for
 A = Goals against
 Pts = Points
 Pos = Final position

 DNQ = Did not qualify
 DNE = Did not enter
 NH = Not Held
 – = Does Not Exist
 R1 = Round 1
 R2 = Round 2
 R3 = Round 3
 R4 = Round 4

 F = Final
 SF = Semi-finals
 QF = Quarter-finals
 R16 = Round of 16
 Group = Group stage
 GS2 = Second Group stage
 QR1 = First Qualifying Round
 QR2 = Second Qualifying Round
 QR3 = Third Qualifying Round

References

Football clubs in Chengdu
2006 establishments in China
Association football clubs established in 2006